Jessica Cecelia Anna Maria Martin (born 25 August 1962) is an English actress, singer, and illustrator. Specializing as an impressionist, her television roles have included Spitting Image, Copy Cats and two series with Bobby Davro. She featured as the werewolf Mags in the 1988 Doctor Who serial The Greatest Show in the Galaxy, and provided the voice of the Queen in the 2007 Doctor Who Christmas special, "Voyage of the Damned".

On stage, Martin starred with Gary Wilmot in the West End show Me and My Girl for two years at the Adelphi Theatre and then on a national tour. She went on to play leading musical roles including Mabel in the 1996 production of Mack and Mabel at the Piccadilly Theatre, Nellie Forbush in South Pacific, Mrs Lovett in Sweeney Todd, Norma Desmond in Sunset Boulevard and the Lady of the Lake in the national tour of Spamalot. Her autobiography, as a graphic novel, Life Drawing: A Life Under Lights, was published in 2019.

Life and career

Early life
Jessica Cecelia Anna Maria Martin was born on 25 August 1962. She graduated with a degree in English and Drama from Westfield College, London University and also studied at the Central School of Speech and Drama. Her first job, in 1983 when she was 21, was as a resident singer at St James's Hotel and Club. Her father, Placido Martin, was a cocktail pianist there. Speaking about her father in a 2019 interview, Martin said that he "was a complex character and much as I loved him, I wanted to give an honest portrayal [in my book] of how self-centred and destructive a 'creative' person can be."

Performance roles
Martin became an impressionist on the fringe circuit in 1983. In a 1984 review of her lunchtime show at the Palace Theatre, London bar, Roy Robert Smith of The Stage wrote that Martin was "armed with guts, determination, and talent [and] must surely soon gain the public recognition she deserves." He noted that she refined her material and renewed her material between shows, and particularly praised her impressions of Gloria Hunniford and Judy Garland. After seeing Martin perform at the Edinburgh Festival Fringe, Rory Bremner persuaded her to focus on impressions, and the pair appeared on radio together. In 1985, Martin was quoted as saying that she had only started doing impressions in public at the fringe for relaxation after appearing in performances Women of Troy there.

She auditioned for several roles, and  became a regular voice cast member for the satirical puppet show Spitting Image. where her roles included Barbra Streisand, and members of the British royal family. She was then invited to audition for London Weekend Television's Copy Cats. Fellow team members included Bobby Davro, with whom she partnered for three series of his weekly show Bobby Davro's TV Weekly. In 1985 she joined Jimmy Cricket on the Central TV production And There's More. In the Nottingham Evening Post, a staff writer commented that Martin "is proving herself to be an accomplished actress, singer, dancer and mickey-taker – definitely a name to watch out for in the future." Martin and Bremner both quit Central TV in September 1985; Bremner had been offered his own BBC2 series, while Martin was due to join Davro in shows for TVS. Bremner and Martin toured UK theatres together in 1987, with a show of impressions.

In 1988, Milton Shulman of The Evening Standard described Martin performing "The Lady Is a Tramp" in Babes in Arms at the  Maynardville Open-Air Theatre as "pert and saucy". Martin played the lead role of Dorothy in a touring production of The Wizard of Oz. Charles Barron of the Aberdeen Evening Express praised Martin's "exuberance" in the role, and wrote that she sang "with great charm".

From 1989, Martin and Gary Wilmot starred in the West End show Me and My Girl for two years at the Adelphi Theatre and then on a national tour. Martin went on to play leading musical roles including Mabel in the 1996 production of Mack and Mabel at the Piccadilly Theatre, Nellie Forbush in South Pacific, Mrs Lovett in Sweeney Todd, and Norma Desmond in Sunset Boulevard. She also guest-starred in the 1988 Doctor Who serial The Greatest Show in the Galaxy, starring Sylvester McCoy as the Doctor, in which she played a punk werewolf called Mags. Many years later, she provided the voice of the Queen in "Voyage of the Damned", the 2007 Christmas special, which starred David Tennant as the Doctor.

She played the Lady of the Lake in the national tour of Spamalot in 2011, Lottie Ames in Mack and Mabel, and Lottie Lacey in the revival of William Inge's The Dark at the Top of the Stairs (both 2012). In October 2015, Martin joined the cast of Elf: The Musical, playing the role of Emily Hobbs at the Dominion Theatre. In September 2016, she was featured in Robert J. Sherman's Bumblescratch playing the dual roles of Bethesda Bumblescratch and the Widow MacGregor at the Adelphi Theatre. She was named a Variety Club Celebrity Ambassador for her work in Bumblescratch and her other works.

Martin played role of Dame Shirley Porter in Shirleymander by Greg Evans at the Playground Theatre, London in 2018, for which she was nominated for the Best Female Performance in the Off West End Awards 2018. In the Daily Telegraph, Ben Lawrence wrote
that Martin "best known for her impersonations .. does a terrific impression, but it is hard to reach inside the soul of this Rottweiler in a pussycat bow". She also received an Off West End Awards nomination for Lead Performance in a Musical for portraying Mrs. Blitzstein in Blitz! at the Union Theatre, London  in 2020.

Martin is a patron of the Music Hall Guild of Great Britain and America, and performed at the 50th anniversary Memorial Service for Lupino Lane at St Paul's, Covent Garden in 2009.

Audio work
Martin appeared on The Impressionists on BBC Radio 2 in 1985. She starred in a 1987 special for the same channel, Jessica Martin's Variety: The Gossip Column Murders. She was a voice actor for the PlayStation 2 game Dragon Quest VIII, and has also performed as a voice over artist for a range of animations and commercials. She has also recorded audio books including Vindication of the Rights of Men written by Mary Wollstonecraft. Martin has appeared in several Doctor Who audio dramas from Big Finish Productions.

Graphic novels
In 2010, Martin took up sketching for the first time since studying A-level art. The following year, whilst touring in Spamalot with Phill Jupitus, she showed him one of her sketches. Jupitus praised the sketch and suggested that Martin should do a graphic novel. Martin has referred to this as a "lightbulb moment." In 2012, Martin showed her work to established comics artist Mark Buckingham, who supported and encouraged her. Her first comic written and drawn by herself was It Girl about silent film actress Clara Bow. It was self-published in November 2013 and was selected in the "Ten Must Own Small-Press Comics 2013" by Broken Frontier.

Elsie Harris Picture Palace, which is set in the 1930s British film industry, was her first full-length graphic novel. It was shortlisted for the Myriad First Graphic Novel Prize 2014. In 2018, Martin illustrated a Doctor Who story, "Hill of Beans", that featured her character Mags from the television series. Life Drawing: A Life Under Lights, a graphic novel memoir about her life as an actress, singer and artist was published by Unbound in Spring 2019.

Filmography

Theatre

Television

Radio

Film

Video games

Publications

Awards and nominations

References

External links
Official website

1962 births
English television actresses
English voice actresses
English stage actresses
English impressionists (entertainers)
Place of birth missing (living people)
English female dancers
English musical theatre actresses
Living people
People from Fulham
English women singers
Actresses from London
Singers from London
20th-century English actresses
21st-century English actresses
English people of Singaporean descent